Severino Reija Vázquez (born 25 November 1938 in Lugo, Galicia) is a former footballer from Spain who played as a defender.

Career
He participated with the national team at the 1962 FIFA World Cup, the 1964 European Nations' Cup, and the 1966 FIFA World Cup.

Honours

Club
Zaragoza
Inter-Cities Fairs Cup: 1963–64
Spanish Cup: 1963–64, 1965–1966

International
Spain
European Nations' Cup: 1964

External links
 
 National team data at BDFutbol
 
 

1938 births
Living people
Footballers from Lugo
Spanish footballers
Association football defenders
La Liga players
Segunda División players
Deportivo de La Coruña players
Real Zaragoza players
Spain under-21 international footballers
Spain B international footballers
Spain international footballers
1962 FIFA World Cup players
1964 European Nations' Cup players
1966 FIFA World Cup players
UEFA European Championship-winning players